Thomas "Toots" Sampson (August 31, 1912 – January 24, 2002) was an American second baseman in the Negro leagues.

He played from 1938 to 1948, playing mostly with the Birmingham Black Barons. During the 1944 Negro World Series, Sampson was injured in a car accident. Fellow players John Britton, Pepper Bassett, Art Wilson, and Leandy Young were also in the car, but sustained minor injuries. Sampson's right leg was broken, and he missed the remainder of the series. In 1946 and 1947, he served as the manager of the Black Barons, before being replaced by Piper Davis. In 1948, Sampson discovered future Baseball Hall of Famer Willie Mays, which led to Mays signing with the Black Barons.

References

External links
 and Seamheads

1912 births
2002 deaths
Negro league baseball managers
Birmingham Black Barons players
Chicago American Giants players
New York Cubans players
Baseball players from Alabama
People from Lowndes County, Alabama
20th-century African-American sportspeople
Baseball infielders
21st-century African-American people